Dunham Township may refer to the following townships in the United States:

 Dunham Township, McHenry County, Illinois
 Dunham Township, Washington County, Ohio